KCSG-LD, virtual channel 8 (UHF digital channel 31), is a low-powered television station licensed to Ogden, Utah, United States. The station is owned by Weigel Broadcasting. KCSG-LD's transmitter is located on SR-68 in Woods Cross, Utah.

K08QL-D (virtual and VHF digital channel 8) in Logan operates as a translator of KCSG-LD; this station's transmitter is located on Wasatch Ridge.

Sale to Weigel Broadcasting
On July 16, 2020, it was announced that KUTA-LD and KQTI-LD would be sold to Chicago-based Weigel Broadcasting for $375,000, pending approval of the Federal Communications Commission (FCC). Weigel intends to use the stations as relays of Cedar City-based KCSG (channel 8) for northern Utah and the Salt Lake City metropolitan area. The sale was completed on September 17.

Digital channels
The stations' digital signals are multiplexed:

KCSG-LD subchannels

K08QL-D subchannels 

K08QL-D (as KUTA-LP) began its digital broadcast on August 30, 2008.

Local programming
Local news and sports are produced by KUTA as well as released online via its website and YouTube. KUTA is also working with local high schools, the Bridgerland Technical College, and Utah State University to produce local content. KUTA also hosts broadcast debates between local U.S. Senate candidates.

References

External links
 KUTA-LD on YouTube
 TV Fool Map for KUTA

Mass media in Salt Lake City
Low-power television stations in the United States
CSG-LD
Heroes & Icons affiliates
Decades (TV network) affiliates
Start TV affiliates
Weigel Broadcasting